Rudolf Herman "Rudi" Fuchs (born 28 April 1942) is a Dutch art historian and curator.

Personal life
Rudolf Herman Fuchs was born on 28 April 1942 in Eindhoven in the Netherlands. He studied art history from 1967 to 1975 at Leiden University, after which he became an academic.

Fuchs has twin sons (born in 1970), one of whom is the noted graphic designer, Rutger Fuchs.
He lives in Amsterdam and Norfolk.

Career
In 1975, Fuchs became director of the Van Abbemuseum in Eindhoven. At that time he was the youngest director of a museum in the Netherlands.

In 1982, he was one of the organisers and the artistic director of Documenta 7 in Kassel in Germany.

Between 1987 and 1993 he was director of the Gemeentemuseum in The Hague, leaving a deficit of around four million euros.

In February 1993 he became director of the Stedelijk Museum in Amsterdam. At first he was general director, later director of art. He worked at the museum until 1 January 2003. His farewell was spoiled by a misunderstanding over VAT with the tax authorities.

Fuchs is currently (2013) a lecturer at the University of Amsterdam and independent writer. He has published widely on art as an author and art critic.

Awards and decorations
Fuchs has received the following awards and decorations:
 Knight in the Order of St. Olav (1996)
 Knight in the Order of the Netherlands Lion (1998)
 Commander in the Order of Merit of the Italian Republic (1998)
 Commander in the Order of the Oak Crown (1999)
 Officer in the Order of Merit of the Federal Republic of Germany (2002)
 Honorary Medal for Merits toward Museum Collections (2004)
 Honorary Medal for Art and Science (2007)

References

1942 births
Commanders of the Order of Merit of the Italian Republic
Dutch art critics
Dutch art historians
Leiden University alumni
Living people
Directors of museums in the Netherlands
Officers Crosses of the Order of Merit of the Federal Republic of Germany
People from Eindhoven
Directors of museums in Amsterdam